Ivano-Frankivsk Oblast, also referred to as Ivano-Frankivshchyna, is an oblast (region) in western Ukraine. Its administrative center is the city of Ivano-Frankivsk. As is the case with most other oblasts of Ukraine this region has the same name as its administrative center – which was renamed by the Soviet Ukrainian authorities after the Ukrainian writer Ivan Franko on 9 November 1962. It has a population of 

Ivano-Frankivsk Oblast is also known to Ukrainians by a deep-rooted alternative name: Prykarpattia (although some sources may also consider the southern Lviv Oblast including such cities as Stryi, Truskavets, and Drohobych, as also part of Prykarpattia).  Prykarpattia, together with Lviv and Ternopil regions, was the main body of the historic region of eastern Halychyna; which in the 13th century was a part of the Kingdom of Rus and the Halych-Volyn Principality (see Kingdom of Galicia–Volhynia). Along with the Lviv and Ternopil regions Prykarpattia is a component of the Carpathian Euroregion.

During the times of the Second Polish Republic the area was known as Stanisławów Voivodeship (1918–1939) and later, after the Soviet invasion of Poland, as Stanislav Oblast (1939–1962). During World War II it was part of the District of Galicia in General Governorate. Until the 20th century the major center of the region was the city of Kolomyia (which is a major cultural center of Pokuttya, the traditional name for the southern part of the oblast).

Name

On November 9, 1962, a decree was issued by the Presidium of the Verkhovna Rada of the UkrSSR, according to which: "Taking into account the wishes of the labor collectives of the city and region, the Presidium of the Verkhovna Rada of the USSR decided to rename the city of Stanislav (Stanislaviv) to Ivano-Frankivsk, and the Stanislav Oblast to Ivano-Frankivsk Oblast." The renaming was timed to the 300th anniversary of the city's founding and in honor of the outstanding Ukrainian writer Ivan Franko.

As with the rest of Ukraine's oblasts Ivano-Frankivsk may also be known by its matronymical name Ivano-Frankivshchyna. However, that name did not receive general public acceptance and commonly Ivano-Frankivsk Oblast is almost always called Prykarpattia (en. Prekarpathians) – a historic name for the same region. (Geographically the historic region covers a much larger portion of Ukraine than just the Ivano-Frankivsk region.)  Formerly as Stanislavshchyna or Stanyslavivshchyna – .

Geography
Ivano-Frankivsk Oblast borders Lviv Oblast to its north and west, Zakarpattia Oblast to its south-west, has a 50-km long state border with Romania (Maramureș County) to its immediate south, and it borders Chernivtsi Oblast to the south-east and Ternopil Oblast to the east. It is situated partly in the Eastern European Plain and partly Carpathian Foothills. The oblast may be divided into three regions: mountainous, pre-mountainous, and plains.

The climate is mildly-continental and damp with cool summers and mild winters.

Relief

The region is situated between two main regional tectonic plates: Carpathian fold belt and Volhynia-Podillya plate. The most prominent features of the first one are the Carpathian Mountains, while the second one - Dniester river.

The Carpathian Mountains contribute tremendously to the change in relief of Ivano-Frankivsk Oblast and their elevation rises from north-east to south-west stretching along the oblast's south-western border. The elevation of the oblast varies from 230m to 2,061m above sea level. The mountains occupy almost one half of the whole Oblast and consist of two main mountain ranges: the Gorgany (highest peak – Mt. Syvulya Major (1,836m)) and the Chornohora range (highest peak – Mt. Hoverla (2,061m)).

The rest of Ivano-Frankivsk Oblast is located within the Dniester river and Prut river valleys. The plains of the oblast are part of the Carpathian Foothills and Opillia Upland (part of Podillia Upland) which are cut through by Dniester. The upland has a temperate-climate habitat mixed with grassland and woodland – also known as the forest steppe. The relief of the region consists mostly of rolling hills of 230-400m over the sea level. Near river valleys are common canyons and ravines.

A particular feature of the southern region of the Ivano-Frankivsk Oblast is Stanislav Canyon, in the so-called Kherson Mountains, a deep cut in the local topography where episodic water flowing into the Baltic has steeply eroded a canyon formation.

The Dniester flows mainly through the Halych Raion and along the administrative border between Ivano-Frankivsk and Ternopil Oblasts. The territory of the region within immediate proximity to the river is traditionally known as Opillia. Opillia, however, stretches far beyond the oblast and only covers two of its raions: Halych Raion and Rohatyn Raion, both located in the north. Relief in the area consists of rolling hills uplands.

The Carpathian foothills consist mostly of low denudation accumulative uplands, while the right bank of Dniester along the border with the Ternopil Oblast depicts karst type relief of Pokuttia Upland. Because of it near that area along Dniester relief shows forms of canyon. Pokuttia Upland between Bystrytsia of Nadvirna and Prut River (Prut-Bystrytsia Upland) serves as drainage divide within the oblast between Dniester and Prut. Carpathian foothills have two depressions: one is at the confluence of Bystrytsia of Solotvyn, Bystrytsia of Nadvirna, Vorona and Bystrytsia rivers, called Bystrytsia Depression, and another is around the city of Kalush, called Kalush Depression.

Hydrology

Ivano-Frankivsk Oblast has a plethora of rivers, waterfalls, mountainous brooks, and smaller ponds, but there is almost no other type of bodies of water such as lakes and water reservoirs. Most of rivers either flow into Dniester or Prut River (tributary of Danube). Segments of Dniester and Cheremosh River are used as administrative borders with Ternopil and Chernivtsi oblasts respectfully.

The water drainage divide between Dniester and Prut cuts the region through middle of following districts: Nadvirna Raion, Kolomyia Raion, Tlumach Raion, and Horodenka Raion.

Nature Sanctuaries
In the Ivano-Frankivsk Region is located a strict nature reserve Gorgany that was created in 1996. There are five national parks in the region. There are numerous natural monuments of feature and habitat management areas (zakazniks).

Government

The government in the region is headed by the chairman of the regional state administration (for simplicity sake - governor) appointed by the President of Ukraine. The governor appoints his deputies forming his regional governing cabinet to supervise the government policies in the region. Aside of the state administration the region has its own council that is headed by its chairman. The composition of the council depends on the popular vote in the region, while the chairman is elected within the elected council.
Regional State Administration
Regional State Administration consists of the chairman and his deputies (5) supported by the "aparat" of the administration. Within the administration are numerous departments, each of them headed by a chief of department. The Ivano-Frankivsk Region State Administration has 17 departments and other government institutions such as the Children Service, regional state archives, and others.

 Office of State Administration
 Chief Department of Economy
 Chief Financial Department
 Chief Department industry and infrastructure development
 Chief Department of tourism, Euro-integration, foreign relations, and investments
 Chief Department of legal and interior policies
 Chief Department of family, youth, and sports
 Chief Department of labor and social security
 Department of culture
 Chief Department of agro-industrial development
 Chief Department of regional development and construction
 Department of communal management
 Department of urban development and architecture
 Chief Department of Education and Science
 Chief Department of Health Security
 Department of Extraordinary Situation and Protection of Population from Consequences of the Chornobyl Catastrophe
 Media Department
 Department of resources and management support
 Children Service
 Inspection of the State Technical Supervision
 Inspection of quality and formation of resources of agricultural products
 State Archives of the Region
 Ivano-Frankivsk regional center for preparation and improving the qualification of workers of bodies of state power, bodies of local self-governing, state enterprises, institutions, and organizations
Regional council

Chairman: Oleksandr Sych (Svoboda)

Regional subdivisions

Since July 2020, Ivano-Frankivsk Oblast is administratively subdivided into six raions. These are 
Ivano-Frankivsk Raion
Kalush Raion
Kolomyia Raion
Kosiv Raion
Nadvirna Raion
Verkhovyna Raion

Primary divisions
The Ivano-Frankivsk Oblast is administratively subdivided into 14 districts (raions) as well as 6 cities (municipalities) which represent a separate raion and in direct subordination to the regional government, among which are Bolekhiv, Kalush, Kolomyya, Yaremche, and the administrative center of the region, Ivano-Frankivsk. Burshtyn became the 6th city of regional importance in 2014. The formation of the region was established in 1921 in the Second Polish Republic and was in majority preserved during the Soviet times. Most of the districts (former powiats) were reestablished as well in 1960s. The major industrial and cultural centers of the region were given a wider form of autonomy and assigned as the cities of regional subordination.

Secondary divisions

City municipalities (councils)/mayors
The oblast has 15 cities which are (alphabetical order): Bolekhiv, Burshtyn, Dolyna, Halych, Horodenka, Ivano-Frankivsk, Kalush, Kolomyia, Kosiv, Nadvirna, Rohatyn, Sniatyn, Tlumach, Tysmenytsia, and Yaremche. Five of those cities are of regional importance and the other ten are of district importance. All cities have its own council and mayor that represent a local form of self-government allowed by the laws on local administration and the Constitution of Ukraine. City municipalities of the region are independent from any district administration.

Town municipalities (councils)
Within the region there are 24 urbanized settlements (towns) which are a special settlement classification inherited from the Soviet municipal organization. Three of those towns serve as administrative centers of their respective districts. Each town has its own council that along with surrounding village councils compose a district administration which has its own executive branch, District State Administration, appointed by the President of Ukraine. Towns do not have a mayoral office and their head of the council serves as the main representative of the whole settlement.

Village municipalities (councils)
All other settlements in the region are considered rural and accounted for some 765 localities including villages and 20 selyshches (smaller villages) which are administered by 477 village councils. Some village municipalities consist of several villages, while others are a single-village municipality. There are several villages that are part of city municipalities such as Ivano-Frankivsk, Bolekhiv, and Yaremcha, while all others are spread out across the districts of the region.

Historical overview of subdivisions
When on November 27, 1939, the Soviet regime was established in Stanisławów Voivodeship, the Polish administrative division of it was kept almost the same until January 17, 1940. Only two powiats Stryi and Zydaczow were transferred away.

On December 4, 1939, the voivodeship was officially renamed into Stanislav Oblast. In 1940 the oblast was redivided into 37 raions and two municipalities (cities of oblast subordination). The administrative centers of the former raions were following settlements: Bohorodchany (town), Bolekhiv (city), Bilshivtsi (town), Bukachivtsi (village), Burshtyn (town), Voinylov (village), Vyhoda (village), Halych (town), Hvizdets (town), Horodenka (town), Delyatyn (town), Dolyna (city), Zhabie (village), Zhovten (town), Zabolotiv (town), Kalush (city), Kolomyia (city), Korshiv (village), Kosiv (city), Kuty (town), Lanchyn (town), Lysets (town), Nadvirna (city), Novytsya (village), Obertyn (town), Otynya (town), Pechenizhyn (town), Rohatyn (city), Rozhnyativ (town), Snyatyn (city), Solotvyn (town), Stanislav (city), Tlumach (city), Tysmenytsya (town), Chernelytsya (town), Yabluniv (town), Yaremcha (village). Two municipalities were cities of Stanislav and Kolomyia. On November 11, 1940, Delyatyn Raion was liquidated. On November 16, 1940, Novytsya Raion was re-administrated under town of Perehinske.

During the World War II the region was occupied by the Nazi Germany (see Operation Barbarossa). Along with Lviv, Drohobych and Tarnopil oblasts, it was reorganized on August 1, 1941, into Distrikt Galizien centered in Lemberg and annexed to the General Government. The area of the former Stanislav Oblast was divided into three kreis (counties): Kalusz, Stanislau, and Kolomea. On July 27, 1944, the region was liberated from the Nazi Germany by the Soviet Army (see Lvov–Sandomierz Offensive).

The administrative division of Stanislav Oblast was reinstated and confirmed on January 1, 1947, with the same 36 raions and two municipalities as their existed before the war. Several settlements, however, had their status elevated. The status of a town obtained Bukachivtsi, Vyhoda, and Yaremcha, while Halych and Horodenka became recognized as cities. The next major changes in the region took place in the late 1950s. In 1957 five raions were liquidated: Vyhoda, Zhovten, Kuty, Pechenizhyn, and Chernelytsya. Then another five were liquidated in 1959: Bukachivtsi, Korshiv, Perehinske, Solotvyn, and Stanislav. On December 30, 1962, within the oblast was created the Verkhovyna Industrial Raion, centered in a town of Verkhovyna.

On October 28, 1963, another major change took place when raions of the oblast were re-administered into the six rural raions, one – industrial, and two municipalities. There were the following administrative centers: Bohorodchany, Halych, Horodenka, Kalush, Kolomyia, Kosiv, Dolyna (municipalities – Ivano-Frankivsk (new name) and Kolomyia). On January 4, 1965, Dolyna Industrial Raion Raion was redesigned into the regular raion, while five other previous raions were recreated: Nadvirna, Rohatyn, Rozhnyativ, Snyatyn, and Tlumach. On December 8, 1966, there were created Verkhovyna and Ivano-Frankivsk raions. That was the last major re-administration of the oblast.

On March 20, 1972, in the city of Kalush was created a municipality and it became a city of oblast subordination. On December 30, 1977, the same thing happened to Yaremcha status of which was elevated as well. On March 28, 1982, the Ivano-Frankivsk Raion was re-administrated under the Tysmenytsya Raion. On October 21, 1993, the city of Bolekhiv became of an oblast subordination with its own municipality. On December 14, 2006, Yaremcha was renamed into Yaremche.

Demographics

According to the Ukrainian Census of 2001 most of the population consider themselves Ukrainians with a small Russian diaspora mostly located within the city of Ivano-Frankivsk. The Russian language is the dominant foreign language in the region and well understood by everyone. Among other common foreign languages are Polish, English, and German languages. The population in the region as the rest of the country was on substantial decline

Religion

The dominant religion in Ivano-Frankvisk Oblast is Ukrainian Greek Catholic Church, professed by 57% of the population. Another 35% is Eastern Orthodox and 6% are unaffiliated generic Christians. Adherents of Roman Catholicism and Protestantism make up 1% of the population respectively.

Age structure
 0-14 years: 16.7%  (male 118,518/female 112,130)
 15-64 years: 69.5%  (male 468,589/female 489,596)
 65 years and over: 13.8%  (male 63,324/female 126,635) (2013 official)

Median age
 total: 37.3 years 
 male: 34.7 years 
 female: 40.0 years  (2013 official)

Culture and tourism

Ivano-Frankivsk Oblast is home of numerous cultural festivals. There are numerous natural and architectural benchmarks that are scattered throughout the region.

One of the famous festivals is the Ukrainian International festival of ethnic music and land art "Sheshory" that usually takes place in the picturesque Hutsul village of the Kosiv Raion Sheshory since 2003. From 2007, however the festival has spread throughout the country taking place in Podillya, Kyiv Oblast, and other places. In August 2010 the village of Spas in the Kolomyia Raion hosted a culinary event Smachny Spas in association with "Sheshory", while in July of the same year another eco-cultural event Trypilske kolo in the Rzhyschiv city of Kyiv region.

The city of Ivano-Frankivsk hosts several other festivals such as the All-Ukrainian festival of art collectives "Carpathian Spring" that takes place every May. Every two year the festival of modern art "Impreza" takes place every other year. Every odd year the city hosts the festival national-patriotic music and poetry "Freedom". Since May 2001 every year the city of Ivano-Frankivsk is the capital of the European blacksmith movement hosting the "Festival of blacksmith" and the art exhibition "Ornamental Forging" that takes place at the Mickewicz Square and neighboring Andrei Sheptytsky Square in city's old town.

On the territory of Ivano-Frankivsk Oblast are located numerous monuments of architectural heritage. On February 8, 1994, near the city of Halych was established the National preserve of Ancient Halych. Among other important sites in the region is the Church of the Holy Spirit located in the city of Rohatyn as well as the Manyava Skete near the village of Manyava in Bohorodchany Raion. The oblast also accounts for some number of various wooden churches of Boykos and Hutsuls traditional architecture.

In the Dolyna Raion (western region) visitors can find the Carpathian Train that still uses a narrow gauge railway system. Train is used for its direct purpose transporting wood as well as for a tourist recreation. The biggest benchmark of the region is the Hoverla mountain, the tallest in the nation. However, due to increased touristic activities in the post-Soviet times the mountain is a subject to a high degree of pollution. No less interesting destination serve the Dovbush rocks that are located near the city of Bolekhiv in mountains. That location was a base of an anti-Polish Peasant movement. Near the Manyava Skete is located the highest waterfall in Ukraine, the Maniava waterfall (20 m). In the same Bohorodchany Raion visitors may find the local mud volcano located near the village of Starunia. It was noticed for the first time in 1977 after an earthquake that took place in Romania.

Bukovel ski resort, centralized around the village of Polianytsia, on the ridge-lines of the Carpathian Mountain range at an elevation of  represents a major all seasons tourist destination in the region. It is one of the most popular ski resorts in Eastern Europe and in 2012 was named the fastest growing ski resort in the world. Bukovel consists of 16 ski lifts with approximately 50 kilometers of pistes. As well as skiing visitors to the resort can enjoy 7 world class hotels, chalets with swimming pools and saunas, as well as numerous other recreational activities ranging from family friendly leisurely activities to extreme sports. During the warmer months the resort boasts cross-country and downhill mountain biking trails. Over 6,000 people visit the resort every year.

Historical and cultural sites

 Recently, a monument of cultural heritage was erected in the city of Kolomyya in Pokuttya. The Pysanka Museum was built in 2000 and is the only museum dedicated to pyanskas in the world.
 Another interesting historical site is the cavern complex in the Dovbush Rock. The site is dedicated to the legendary freedom fighter Oleksa Dovbush who in legend fights against the Polish szlachta.
 The Church of the Holy Spirit, built in 1598, is located in the north of the Oblast in the small city of Rohatyn.

Popular culture
In 1979 Sofia Rotaru performed the song "Krai" ([Native] Land) about Prykarpattia. In the song Rotaru calls Prykarpattia the land of the Cheremosh and Prut rivers.

Transportation

Roads

State highways
Through Ivano-Frankivsk Oblast runs one European route  which travels through the city of Rohatyn in the north. It coincides with the Ukrainian International highway  which is the only highway of that classification in the region. The highway travels from Zhydachiv in Lviv Oblast and after passing Rohatyn travels towards Berezhany in Ternopil Oblast.

Besides that highway, through the region run three highways of national importance.
 traveling from Lviv the route enters the region from the north near Rohatyn and after passesing the cities of Ivano-Frankivsk and Yaremcha continues on towards Rakhiv going over the Carpathian ridge.
 starts in Stryi, passes through Ivano-Frankivsk, Kolomyia and Sniatyn, and continues on towards Chernivtsi.
 starts from the center of Ivano-Frnkivsk and through Tysmenytsia (Ivano-Frankivsk Oblast) and Monastyryska (Ternopil Oblast), terminating in Ternopil.

There is also small network of minor P-highways.
 runs from Tyaziv (north of Ivano-Frankivsk) through Tlumach and Horodenka to Sniatyn.
 runs from Dolyna over the Carpathian to Khust (Zakarpattia Oblast).
 runs from Tatariv (Yaremche municipality) to Verkhovyna, Kosiv, Kolomyia, Hvizdets, Horodenka, and Ternopil Oblast.
 runs from Bohorodchany to the village of Stara Huta.
 runs from Verkhniy Yaseniv (Verkhovyna Raion) to Usteriky, then by the Prut valley and the Chernivtsi Oblast border travels to Kuty where it turns into Chernivtsi Oblast towards Storozhynets.

Regional highways
T-network (09) includes:
 - Kalush, Yasen, Kuzmynets
 - Borshniv-Osada, Rozhniativ, Kosmach, Nadvirna
 - Halych, Medukha, Zastavche, Pidhaitsi
 - Ozeryany, Obertyn, Hvizdets, Zabolotiv, Rozhniv, Kuty
 - Delyatyn, Lanchyn, Kolomyia
 - Ivano-Frankivsk, Cherniiv, Nadvirna, Bystrytsia
 - Kosiv, Rozhniv, Sniatyn
 - Kalush, Burshtyn
 - Bolekhiv, Tysiv, Kozakivka
 - Pistyn, Mykytyntsi, Verkhniy Verbizh
 - (Lviv Oblast) Kurovychi, Peremyshlyany, Rohatyn
 - (Lviv Oblast) Kalush, Zhuravno, Zhydachiv, Rozdil, Mykolaiv
 - (Chernivtsi Oblast) / (Romanian border) (route 209G) Seliatyn, Parkulyna, Dykhtynets, Marynychi, Pidzakharychi, Kuty, Sloboda Banyliv, Chortoryia, Hlynytsia, Chernivtsi
 - (Chernivtsi Oblast) Horodenka, Khreshchatyk
 - (Chernivtsi Oblast) Vyzhnytsia, Kuty, Pidzakharychi

Notable people
People born in Prykarpattya include:

Historical figures
 Yaroslav Osmomysl, prince of Halych
 Roxelana, chief consort of Ottoman sultan Suleiman the Magnificent
  a leader of the Khmelnytsky Uprising beginning in 1648
 Potocki family, Polish high nobles (magnates)
 Józef Potocki, Great Hetman of the Crown
 Oleksa Dovbush, 18th century folk hero
 Stepan Bandera, Nazi collaborator
 Dmytro Vitovsky, Austro-Hungarian and later Ukrainian separatist politician and military leader

Writers
 Mariyka Pidhiryanka
 Vasyl Stefanyk
 
 Ivan Vahylevych
 Marko Cheremshyna
 Manès Sperber

Artists
 founder of the Association of Independent Ukrainian Artists
  opera singer
 Mika Newton, singer
 Dmytro Pavlychko, poet

See also
Poland's Stanisławów Voivodeship (1921–1939)
List of Canadian place names of Ukrainian origin – Ukrainian immigrants to Canada brought place names from this oblast to Saskatchewan and Alberta; a few one-room schools had names of villages from this region.
Ivano-Frankivsk Oblast local election, 2006
List of heads of government in Ivano-Frankivsk Oblast and Stanislawow Voivodeship

References
Notes

External links
 Ivano-Frankivsk Oblast official site
 Oblast council official site  
 "JewishGalicia.net" – Jewish history in the Ivano-Frankivsk Oblast
 Handbook on history of Communist Party and Soviet Union
 History of the region
 Передати Виноградську  сільраду  Тлумацького району до складу Коломийського району.
 History of administrative territorial division of the region since 18th century 

 
Oblasts of Ukraine
States and territories established in 1939
1939 establishments in Ukraine